Cornelis Bicker van Swieten (25 October 1592 – 15 September 1654), heer (lord) Van Swieten and of Kasteel Swieten, was an Amsterdam regent of the Dutch Republic during the Golden Age and a governor of the Dutch West India Company. He was also a sugar merchant, hoogheemraad of the Hoogheemraadschap van Rijnland and a counsellor of the States of Holland and West Friesland for Amsterdam at The Hague. He belonged to the Dutch States Party and was in opposition to the House of Orange.

Life

Family

Born in Amsterdam, Cornelis Bicker was a member of that city's Bicker family - along with their allies the De Graeff family, they controlled Amsterdam's city government and the province of Holland for half a century. Both families were powerful and influential between the earlier 17th century and the Rampjaar 1672 during the height of the Republic's power.   

Cornelis Bicker was the son of Gerrit Bicker, mayor of Amsterdam in 1603, and Aleyd Andriesdr Boelens. His brothers were Andries, Jacob and Jan. In 1617 he married Aertge Witsen (1599–1652) - they had five children:
Margaretha, married Gerard van Hellemond and later Cornelis Geelvinck
Alida, married Lambert Reynst
Elisabeth, married her cousin Andries de Graeff
Maria, married Gerbrand Ornia
Dr. Gerard Bicker (I) van Swieten (1632–1716), married Catharina van Sypesteyn.

Genealogical and political Legacy
  

Cornelis and Andries Bicker, together with their cousins Cornelis and Andries de Graeff, saw themselves as the political heirs of the old regent family Boelens, whose main lineage, which had remained catholic, had died out in the male line in 1647. They had received the very significant first names Andries and Cornelis from their Boelens ancestors. As in a real dynasty, members of the two families frequently intermarried in the 17th century in order to keep their political and commercial capital together. Its great historical ancestor was Andries Boelens (1455-1519), the city's most influential medieval mayor. Both families, Bicker and De Graeff, descend in the female line from Boelens. He was allowed to hold the highest office in Amsterdam fifteen times.

Career 

In 1617 Cornelis Bicker and his wife settled at Singel 130 in Amsterdam, in a building which his family only sold in 1767. In 1622 he became governor of the Dutch West India Company and also held several directorships, such as of the Wisselbank. In 1628 he became a schepen. In 1632 he bought the Swieten estate and manorhouse from Hugo Cuyk van Mierop - from these he later derived his title. In 1634 he was appointed a captain in the militia or schutterij. He was mayor of Amsterdam in 1646, 1650 and 1654. In 1647 he became a deputy for East Friesland at the States General.

Cornelis Bicker was member even of the Bickerse league, which included the brothers Cornelis, Andries Jacob, Jan, Andries' son Gerard Bicker, and their distant cousins, the brothers Jacob Jacobsz Bicker (1612-1676; he was also the husband of Andries' daughter Alida Bicker) and Hendrick Jacobsz Bicker (1615-1651). They opposed the stadtholder Frederick Henry, Prince of Orange, who intended the centralize the five admiralties, which would cause the Admiralty of Amsterdam to lose influence.

Cornelis Bicker supported his brother Andries, Jacob de Witt and Cornelis de Graeff in the signing of the Peace of Münster and in May 1650 he supported a proposal that suggested military cutbacks to encourage peace efforts. On 30 July 1650 he activated the militia to defend against an attack on Amsterdam by the New stadholder William II of Orange after being warned of William's approach by a postman travelling from Hamburg to Amsterdam, who passed on the news to Bicker's nephew (via his brother, the former mayor Andries) Gerard Bicker, then the bailiff or drost of Muiden. Gerard set off for Amsterdam immediately and after receiving the news Cornelis and Andries raised the bridges, shut the gates and deployed artillery. The attack failed but after the attack De Graeff passed on a message from William that Cornelis and Andries must resign from their posts on the town council. However, they were restored to them on 22 November the same year.

In art

Blick commissioned a large-format portrait of himself and his family from Cornelis van der Voort in 1618. Cornelis Bicker also appears as a captain in a 1638 militia group portrait by Joachim von Sandrart, commissioned by the Kloveniersdoelen to mark the visit of Maria de Medici and now in the Rijksmuseum in Amsterdam. Another painting of Blick dates to 1654 and is attributed to Govert Flinck - this work was praised by Vondel. His wife was also painted by David Bailly.

External links 

 Cornelis Bicker Biography I at Nieuw Nederlands Biografisch Woordenboek
 Cornelis Bicker Biography II at Biographisch Woordenboek der Nederlanden
 Letterkundig woordenboek voor Noord en Zuid

References

Bibliography
 Jonathan I. Israel: The Dutch Republic: Its Rise, Greatness, and Fall: 1477-1806. Clarendon Press, Oxford 1995, 
  Cornelis Bicker - Biography on DBNL
  Kernkamp, G.W. (1977) Prins Willem II 1626-1650
  P. Burke: Venetië en Amsterdam. Een onderzoek naar de elites in de zestiende eeuw. 1974
  J.E. Elias, De Vroedschap van Amsterdam 1578-1795, deel 1 (Haarlem 1903), p. 175
  Zandvliet, Kees De 250 rijksten van de Gouden Eeuw - Kapitaal, macht, familie en levensstijl (2006 Amsterdam; Nieuw Amsterdam Uitgevers)

Dutch West India Company people from Amsterdam
Businesspeople from Amsterdam
Municipal councillors of Amsterdam
Mayors of Amsterdam
17th-century Dutch people
1592 births
1654 deaths
Cornelis